Eriogonum cernuum is a species of wild buckwheat known by the common name nodding buckwheat. It is native to much of western North America, where it grows in sandy and gravelly habitat, including woodland and sagebrush. It is an annual herb growing up to about 60 centimeters in maximum height with a thin, branching flowering stem. The rounded, woolly leaves are one or two centimeters wide and are mainly located about the base of the stem. The inflorescence is evenly lined with hanging involucres of flowers. The individual flowers are less than 2 millimeters wide and white to pink-tinged in color.

External links
Jepson Manual Treatment
Photo gallery

cernuum